Yenibelkavak is a village in the Kızılören District, Afyonkarahisar Province, Turkey. Its population is 119 (2021).

References

Villages in Kızılören District